Vaguthu Faaithu Nuvanees is a Maldivian romantic drama television series developed for Television Maldives by Arifa Ibrahim. The series stars Niuma Mohamed, Mariyam Zuhura, Lufshan Shakeeb and Ahmed Asim in pivotal roles.

Premise
Sama (Niuma Mohamed), Shazma (Mariyam Zuhura) and Firaq (Ahmed Azmeel) are three colleagues working at the same office under Shifaz (Lufshan Shakeeb). Sama, the pampered daughter of Waheed (Roanu Hassan Manik) and Shameema (Aminath Shareef) has romantic feeling towards Shifaz while he is more attracted to Shazma who lives with his brother, Saleem (Ali Shameel) and her wicked sister-in-law, Jameela (Aminath Rasheedha). Shazma initiates a relationship with Firaq's friend, Ahmed Shamin (Ahmed Asim).

Cast and characters

Main
 Niuma Mohamed as Sama
 Lufshan Shakeeb as Shifaz
 Mariyam Zuhura as Shazma (33 episodes)
 Ahmed Asim as Ahmed Shamin
 Sheela Najeeb as Shazma (17 episodes)

Recurring
 Aminath Rasheedha as Jameela
 Ali Shameel as Saleem
 Aminath Shareef as Shameema; Sama's mother
 Roanu Hassan Manik as Waheed; Sama's father
 Ahmed Azmeel as Firaz
 Mariyam Shakeela as Haneefa

Guest
 Ahmed Nimal as Shareef; Sama's birth father
 Mohamed Faisal as a witness

Soundtrack

Accolades

References

Serial drama television series
Maldivian television shows
Films directed by Arifa Ibrahim